Destinee Dominique Arnold is a Belizean beauty pageant titleholder who was crowned Miss Universe Belize 2019. She represented Belize at Miss Universe 2019.

Pageantry

Miss International 2012
Destinee represented Belize at the Miss International 2012 pageant on October 21, 2012 at Okinawa Prefectural Budokan Arena Building in Okinawa, Japan but unplaced.

Miss Costa Maya 2013
Destinee also represented Belize at the Miss Costa Maya 2013 where she won the title.

Miss Universe Belize 2019
Destinee returned to pageantry and won the title of Miss Universe Belize 2019 pageant held on September 6, 2019 at the Belize City Civic Center, beating the runners-up were Destiny Wagner and Markeisha Young. She was crowned by outgoing titleholder Jenelli Fraser.

Miss Universe 2019
As Miss Universe Belize, Destinee represented Belize at the Miss Universe 2019 pageant, but Unplaced.

References

External links
Miss Universe Belize on Facebook

1993 births
Living people
Belizean beauty pageant winners
Miss Universe 2019 contestants
People from Cayo District